St. Peter's Episcopal Church, circa 1849, is an Episcopal church located at the junction of VA 3 and VA 205 in historic Oak Grove, Westmoreland County, Virginia. Originally named Appomattox, the current Washington Parish was established in 1653 by early settlers to the Virginia colonies. The existing sanctuary building is Gothic Revival style brick.  The vestry room, recept and single round Agnus Dei stained glass window were added in 1860. An exposed cross-beamed ceiling and roof were built in 1882–1883.

St. Peter's, Oak Grove, was listed on the National Register of Historic Places in 2004.

Several children and grandchildren of church founders and early members were among the nation's first leaders:

Two sons of Colonel Thomas Lee,  Richard Henry Lee and Francis Lightfoot Lee, signed the Declaration of Independence.

[John Washington], one of the earliest settlers in the region, became great-grandfather to George Washington, first President of the United States.

Andrew Monroe became great-great grandfather to President James Monroe.

Colonel Thomas Marshall was father to John Marshall, the fourth Chief Justice of the United States Supreme Court.

References
Website: https://www.stpetersoakgrove.org/

Churches completed in 1849
19th-century Episcopal church buildings
Episcopal churches in Virginia
Gothic Revival church buildings in Virginia
Churches in Westmoreland County, Virginia
Churches on the National Register of Historic Places in Virginia
National Register of Historic Places in Westmoreland County, Virginia
1849 establishments in Virginia